Muhammad Qyamuddin Ali, known as Qaim Chandpuri or Kayem Chandpuri (1722-1793), was an Indian poet.

Life

He was born in Chandpur, Bijnor and died in Rampur, Uttar Pradesh. He was a contemporary of Mir Taqi Mir, Khwaja Mir Dard, Mirza Muhammad Rafi Sauda, Qalandar Bakhsh Jurat and Mashafi He wrote ghazals.

Legacy

M. Moizuddin received his Ph.D. in Urdu for his thesis Life and works of Qaim Chandpuri by the University of Dhaka in Bangladesh.

References

Urdu-language poets from India
Muslim poets
18th-century Indian Muslims
18th-century Indian poets
1722 births
1793 deaths
Indian male poets
Poets from Uttar Pradesh
18th-century male writers
People from Bijnor district